Campo Verde High School (CVHS) is a public high school located in Gilbert, Arizona, United States. It was built in 2009 and is part of the Gilbert Public Schools district. The school accommodates grades 9–12, and in 2018, the school had a student body of 2,091.

Campo Verde's colors are Dark Green and Copper and the teams are collectively called the Coyotes. The school is a member of the Arizona Interscholastic Association's 5A - San Tan Conference and competes in Division I and II sports.

The overarching philosophy of the high school is to promote an environment that sparks creativity, inspires innovation, embraces the principles of citizenship, and fosters an atmosphere of lifelong learning. Graduates of CVHS are groomed to be responsible, well-rounded, ethical members of society positioned to succeed in their next level of achievement as employees, students pursuing continued education, employers, or a combination of these outcomes. High expectations at all levels, fluid and clear channels of communication, strong parental involvement, and endless possibilities frame the daily operations at Campo Verde High School. In addition, evaluation of student learning outcomes, institutional effectiveness, and structured, self-reflection play critical roles in the evolution of the school.

History
The school was built by Core Construction and opened in the fall of 2009. The school's name is Spanish for "green field," an allusion to Greenfield Elementary School, local arterial Greenfield Road, and to the role of Spanish-speaking people in building Gilbert.

In February 2010, the district installed two  solar panels on the site to help power a third of the school.

Demographics
Campo Verde High School has a nearly equal enrollment of male (51%) and female (49%) students, with a total population of 2094 in the 2017-2018 school year.. The population has steadily grown since its opening in 2009 and offers a rich academic experience, diverse course offerings, and a wide variety of activities, clubs, and organizations. The campus has hosted an array of events including band competitions, sporting events, community gatherings, and most recently the regional host for the Fiesta Bowl Charities/Be Kind event on 8/29/2017 with over 4000 attendees and ESPN coverage. The school's participation in community focused events is a direct reflection of the guiding principles that frame the decisions made, the outcomes experienced, and the passion of the leadership, faculty and staff to provide diverse learning opportunities for all.

Extracurricular activities

Athletics
For the 2010–11 school year, CVHS began fielding varsity sports and also opened its doors to juniors (11th grade students). In the 2011–2012 school year it had its first senior graduating class, and in the 2012–2013 year it had its first four-year graduation.

 Badminton
 Baseball
 Basketball (Boys)
 Basketball (Girls)
 Cheer
 Cross Country
 Football
 Golf (Boys)
 Golf (Girls)
 Soccer (Boys)
 Soccer (Girls))
 Softball
 Swim and Dive
 Tennis (Boys)
 Tennis (Girls)
 Track and field
 Volleyball (Boys)
 Volleyball (Girls)
 Wrestling

Band
The Coyote Pride Marching Band, directed by Matt Kozacek has tripled in size over the past three years, currently has 97 members, and has become one of Arizona's elite band programs. On August 13, 2017 The Coyote Pride Marching Band performed the National Anthem at a televised Diamondbacks vs. Cubs baseball game at Chase Field, in Phoenix, AZ with over 41,000 in attendance. The band programs have received numerous awards and state championships under Mr. Kozacek's leadership. He believes firmly in music and arts education for all students and his core philosophies include teaching life skills and passion through music.

Clubs and Activities

 Academic Decathlon
 AFJROTC AZ-951
 Anime Club
 Art Club
 Astronomy Club
 Band Council
 Best Buddies
 Biomedical Science (Biomed)
 Book Club
 Chef's Club - FCCLA
 Chess Club
 Culture Club
 Choir
 Concert Band
 Drama Club
 Drum Line
 Drill
 Dungeons & Dragons Club
 Early Childhood - FCCLA
 Environmental Science Club
 Ethnic Student Union
 FBLA/BOSAS
 FBLA/Business Computers
 Fellowship of Christian Athletes (FCA)
 Fellowship of Christian Students (FCS)
 FFA
 French National Honor Society
 Gaming Club
 Girls Who Code
 Green Team
 Hiking Club
 Investment Club
 Japanese Club
 JROTC 
 Key Club
 League of Literary Legends (Creative Writing)
 Link Crew
 Marching Band
 Marine Biology Club
 Math Club
 National Honor Society
 No Place for Hate/Radiate
 Orchestra
 Orchestra Council
 Pair A Dice
 Physical Education (PE)
 Robotics
 Spanish Honor Society
 Speech/Debate Club
 Sports Med
 Strings Ensemble
 Student Council (STUCO)
 Theater
 Tri M
 Turning Point
 United Sound
 Wind Ensemble
 Winter Guard 
 Yearbook

References

External links
Official site
AZcentral.com - High School Sports - Campo Verde High School

Education in Gilbert, Arizona
Educational institutions established in 2009
Public high schools in Arizona
Schools in Maricopa County, Arizona
2009 establishments in Arizona